Punjena paprika (lit. stuffed pepper) is a Southeastern European dish made of peppers, stuffed with a mix of meat and rice in tomato sauce,  the ingredients consisting of (most often yellow) bell peppers, eggs, spices, salt, tomato, minced meat and rice. 

The dish is called Punjena paprika/Пуњена паприка in Croatian and Serbian language, Filovana paprika in Bosnian, Polnjena paprika in  Slovenian, Palnena Chushka in Bulgarian, Polneti Piperki in Macedonian, Plněná paprika in Czech, Plnená paprika in Slovak,  and Töltött paprika in Hungarian, meaning "stuffed peppers", Фарширований перець in Ukrainian, meaning "stuffed pepper". It is popular as a summer meal in Hungary, Czech Republic, Slovakia, Serbia, North Macedonia, Bulgaria, Bosnia, Croatia, Slovenia, Montenegro, and Ukraine. There are also many variations of the dish across the Balkans.

Variants of the dish

Stuffed peppers are a traditional dish in all Southeastern European cuisines. Most commonly they are prepared by filling the peppers with a mixture of minced meat, rice and several spices.

Traditionally in Bulgaria the filling is made of rice steamed in advance, onions, minced meat and spices, heat-treated and crammed into pre-cleaned, washed and riddled with needle peppers. After filling of peppers, they are put in a baking dish, water is added and the dish is baked in the oven. If raw egg is added to the cooled stuffing, filled peppers can be cooked in a pan, as the pods are boiled almost steamed.

Besides minced meat and rice, other fillings may be used, such as vegetables (for example leek) and rice, beans, or fresh cheese and eggs. The peppers themselves can be either fresh or dried. Dried red peppers are used especially in southeastern Serbia around Pirot and Dimitrovgrad, often in winter.

See also
Stuffed peppers
List of stuffed dishes

References

Serbian cuisine
Bosnia and Herzegovina cuisine
Croatian cuisine
Hungarian cuisine
Stuffed vegetable dishes
Bulgarian cuisine
Montenegrin cuisine
Slovenian cuisine
National dishes